Sedovka is a rural locality (a village) in Novonadezhdinsky Selsoviet, Blagoveshchensky District, Bashkortostan, Russia. The population was 2 as of 2010. There is 1 street.

Geography 
Sedovka is located 17 km northeast of Blagoveshchensk (the district's administrative centre) by road. Kamennaya Polyana is the nearest rural locality.

References 

Rural localities in Blagoveshchensky District